Bases Loaded, known in Japan as , is a baseball video game by Jaleco that was originally released for the Nintendo Entertainment System. It was first released in 1987 in Japan and in 1988 in North America, and a Game Boy port was released in July of 1990. A mobile phone version exists as well. For the Virtual Console, Bases Loaded was released on September 11, 2007, in Japan and on April 7, 2008, in North America for the Wii, at the cost of 500 Wii Points and on May 15, 2013, in Japan and on July 10, 2014, in North America for Nintendo 3DS. The Wii U version in North America (which later released in Japan on October 22, 2014) was also released at the same time as the Nintendo 3DS version. A port by Mebius and Clarice Games for the PlayStation 4 was released in Japan in 2015.

The game is the first installment of the Bases Loaded series, followed by seven sequels across three generations of consoles. There are three more video games in the Bases Loaded NES series, Bases Loaded II: Second Season, Bases Loaded 3 and Bases Loaded 4. There was also a Game Boy version of Bases Loaded. The series continued onto the SNES platform with Super Bases Loaded, Super Bases Loaded 2, and Super Bases Loaded 3. The final entry to the series was Bases Loaded '96: Double Header, released for the Sega Saturn and PlayStation.

Bases Loaded is also the first in a series of sports games by Jaleco known in Japan as Moero!!. Baseball games were localized in the Western markets as the Bases Loaded series while the basketball game was localized as Hoops, the tennis game as Racket Attack and the soccer game as Goal!. Two titles went unlocalized: a baseball game Shin Moero!! Pro Yakyū and a judo game Moero!! Juudou Warriors.

Gameplay
The game allows the player to control one of 12 teams in either a single game or a full season. For single games, there is also a two-player option.

Bases Loaded featured a television-style depiction of the pitcher-batter matchup (previously seen in Intellivision World Series Baseball and Accolade's HardBall!), as well as strong play control and a relatively high degree of realism, which made it one of the most popular baseball games of the early NES.

One unique feature of the game is that the pitcher can provoke a batter to charge the mound. Each team has only one batter (usually the team's best hitter) who can be provoked in this manner, however; it is up to the player to discover who it is.

At the time Bases Loaded was released, few video games were licensed by North American major league sports. Therefore, the league depicted in Bases Loaded is a fictitious league of twelve teams. They are:
 Boston - has above-average starting pitching with Bopper, Fine, and Page; a strong bullpen; and a powerful lineup powered by Freida, Norkus, and Angel
 D.C. - carries a great offense led by Doreo, Fendy, and Boro but has below-average starting pitching and an average bullpen with the exception of the practically unhittable Hall. If the controller is used properly, Hall will strike out just about everyone until the 5th or 6th inning. 
 Hawaii - has a strong hitting lineup led by Brutus, Debro, and Moon; reasonable starting pitching; and an average bullpen
 Jersey - boasts the most explosive offense in the game anchored by Paste (best hitter in the game with a .467 average and 60 home runs), Bay, and Ford but has starting and relief pitching that is average at best, unreliable at worst.
 Kansas - features a starting rotation led by Patson, who has the fastest fastball in the game (102 mph) and good relief pitching, but an average offense, led by Patty and Baker, that has decent power but low hitting averages
 L.A. - features a lineup with decent hitting averages but little power led by Wales and Bacon but has an average starting rotation led by Tucker and mediocre bullpen
 Miami - holds the best starting pitching rotation with Henter (best pitcher in the game with a 1.85 earned run average), West, and Jarvis; average bullpen led by closer Irving; and weak offense led by Warner
 N.Y. - has a great starting rotation of Carter, Howe, and Cora; an excellent bullpen led by Errico and Fiore; and a starting lineup led by Star that lacks some home run power but hits solidly throughout
 Omaha - has average starting pitching led by Rennor, fair bullpen, and below-average lineup led by Lyonse and Carus; Once you get past the third inning, Rennor can be unhittable
 Philly - boasts the best overall pitching staff with the second best starting rotation with Gantos, Car, and Rush; the best bullpen led by Ellis; and a lineup with a solid middle of the order of Evans, Oko, and Rubin but otherwise average offense
 Texas - has a high hitting offense anchored by Marcus but a very porous pitching staff
 Utah - has one of the best offenses in the game led by Agua and Harlan, featuring a Jekyll and Hyde pitching staff with a strong starting pitching rotation led by Quinta, Lep, and Stava and an inconsistent bullpen led by Bella, one of the best closers in the game, but also features three of the five worst earned run averages.

Also noteworthy is the fact that the umpires' names are given. In the Western version, they are as follows:

PL: Yuk
1B: Dum
2B: Boo
3B: Bum

In the Japanese version, the names shown are the last names of the developers.

Disembodied catcher's mitt
One of the trademark images of the Bases Loaded franchise was the disembodied catcher's mitt, also referred to as the "phantom paw", that would catch pitches that were thrown extremely outside. Developer Heep Sop Choi claims it was programmed to show the catcher making some terrific snatches without any bodily movement.

Release 
A defective chip was found during manufacturing, delaying the Nintendo Entertainment System version's North American release.

A port for the Atari Jaguar was planned to be developed by Jaleco, after being signed by Atari Corporation to be a third-party developer for the system, but it was never released.

Sequels
The game saw three sequels on the NES: Bases Loaded II: Second Season (released in 1988 in Japan and 1990 in North America), Bases Loaded 3, released in 1991, and Bases Loaded 4, released in 1993. The game also had two arcade sequels: Moero!! Pro Yakyū Homerun, released in 1988, and Jitsuryoku!! Pro Yakyū, released in 1989. Japanese game magazine Game Machine listed Jitsuryoku!! Pro Yakyū on their September 1, 1989 issue as being the eighth most-successful table arcade unit of the month; the magazine has listed it in English as Bases Loaded. Super Bases Loaded was released for the SNES in 1991, and saw two sequels: Super Bases Loaded 2, released in 1994, and Super Bases Loaded 3, released in 1995. A 32-bit installment was also released: Bases Loaded '96: Double Header, released for the PlayStation and Sega Saturn in 1995.

Reception
Computer Gaming World compared the game unfavorably to Accolade's HardBall!, both focusing primarily on the confrontation of pitcher and batter. The review described Bases Loaded's viewpoint behind the pitcher as making it far too difficult to discern the position of, and subsequently hit, the ball. Other annoyances during gameplay, such as the inability to see where outfielders were before the ball got to them, were contrasted against the game's good graphics and animation.

References

External links 
 Bases Loaded at GameFAQs
 Bases Loaded at Giant Bomb
 Bases Loaded at MobyGames

1987 video games
Baseball video games
Bases Loaded video games
Cancelled Atari Jaguar games
City Connection franchises
Game Boy games
Jaleco games
Mobile games
Multiplayer and single-player video games
Nintendo Entertainment System games
Tose (company) games
Video games developed in Japan
Virtual Console games
Virtual Console games for Wii U
Virtual Console games for Nintendo 3DS